Bully (originally titled The Bully Project) is a 2011 American documentary drama film directed and co-produced by Lee Hirsch and co-produced and written by Cynthia Lowen along with producers Cindy Waitt and Sarah Foudy. The film follows the lives of five students who face bullying on a daily basis in U.S. schools and premiered at the 2011 Tribeca Film Festival. It was also screened at the Hot Docs Canadian International Documentary Festival and the LA Film Festival.

Bully had its global premiere at Italy's Ischia Film Festival on July 17, 2011. Bully was acquired by The Weinstein Company immediately after its premiere at the Tribeca Film Festival. The film was released in United States theaters on March 30, 2012.

On the official website, the filmmakers promoted Bully as an important advocacy tool against bullying and in facilitating an anti-bullying movement. Contrary to the filmmaker's goals, the film suffered from a lack of accessibility in theatres due to controversy surrounding its MPAA rating and from an extended downtime between theatre and home release. The film was released on Blu-ray and DVD on February 12, 2013, only with the PG-13-rated version.

Content 
The documentary follows students from public schools in Georgia, Iowa, Texas, Mississippi and Oklahoma during the 2009–10 school year; it also follows the students' families. The film's particular focus is on the deaths of Tyler Long, who was diagnosed with Asperger’s Syndrome, and Ty Smalley, both victims of bullying who died by suicide. The film describes in great detail how the average American student cannot defend himself or herself against ridicule.

Synopsis

This documentary is about five teenagers and the varieties of bullying or harassment that they went through. The film jumps back and forth between the teens to describe their lives. The film starts off by telling the story of Tyler Long and how he died. Tyler’s father speaks about his son’s social issues and how he knew early on that Tyler might become a victim of bullying. Mr. Long mentions that kids took his clothes when he showered, forcing him to leave naked. They shoved him into lockers and demoralized him verbally as well. These actions are said to have led Tyler to commit suicide in 2009, at the age of 17, when his father found him hanging in his closet with a note on the bed.

Alex Libby, who was diagnosed with Asperger syndrome, is 12 years old, and is interviewed about his family and how nervous he is to return to school, as he has issues making friends. The cameraman follows him to the bus stop and onto the bus, where the bullying begins and doesn’t stop. The boy sitting beside him on the bus is seen violently threatening him. At school, the camera captures instances of bullying that do not directly pertain to Alex, but do show the principal of the school noticing and simply saying the children should get along but doing little to put an end to it. A boy named Cody is pulled from class to discuss being bullied at lunch, but pulling him out of class was simply a move by the school to give the appearance of attempting to address the issue at hand.

Kelby Johnson is a 16 year-old girl who has come out to her hometown as a lesbian. She states that she is not welcome anywhere in the town, due to the town’s religious and societal beliefs. Kelby states that as she was walking down the road a group of boys hit her with a minivan and did not slow down, knowing it was her. Kelby admits that she used to self-harm and has tried to commit suicide three times now. The family mentions that when Kelby’s sexuality came out even the people they were close with stopped talking to them. During the school year, kids would harass, bully, and ignore her. She mentions that even the teachers would bully her and exclude her from events, like calling her as part of a separate roll call list. Her parents have offered to move several times, but Kelby refuses stating that, “If I leave, they win.”

Ja’Meya Jackson is a 14-year-old teenage girl who lives with her mother. She went to school in Yazoo County, Mississippi. Ja’Meya is an honor student and talented basketball player. The children harassed and picked on her for quite some time. Even so, Ja’Meya had plans to join the Navy in order to help her mother. She explains that one day she finally had enough and took her mother’s gun to school in an attempt to intimidate her bullies into leaving her alone. It works and the bullies are terrified, but she was then tackled to the ground by another student and arrested by the police.

Tyler’s parents used their son’s death to focus on the issue of bullying at the schools in their town. They held a town meeting, trying to find a way to fix the problem and show the schools and the officers that it is a serious problem. The administrators felt that “kids will be kids” and the teachers shrugged it off, not really taking a stance on the problem even when they knew of bullying in the classroom. During the town meeting Tyler’s family arranges for another child to speak up about bullying and how the teachers don’t pay attention; his name is Devon and he used to be bullied in the past.

Ja’Meya is told the charges against her will be dropped, if she accepts to be held in a psychiatric hospital for 3 months. After that she will be allowed to go home, unless a doctor states otherwise.

Ty Smalley is a younger child who was bullied relentlessly until he committed suicide at age 11. He had been bullied because of his height, as he was quite small at the time. The school officials claim that bullying wasn’t a factor, even though his friend says otherwise. Trey Wallace, his best friend, claims that Ty was extremely sad the last time that he saw him; he said he was crying. They show pieces of Ty’s funeral, including his parents, “tucking in their baby one last time.” Trey is overcome with emotion and cries at Ty’s casket. He later explains that he used to be a bully when he was in second grade, but as he got older he realized the harm and hurt he did to people. He mentions that when he tried to stand up for Ty, the latter would always tell him that, “they aren’t worth it,” or, “don’t be like them,” getting Trey to back down.

We see Kelby rather happy talking about the rain with her current girlfriend. She claims she would not be here, or be able to go to school, without her friends and girlfriend. She refuses to let her bullies “win”.

Alex is shown being bullied while on the bus. He has been stabbed, punched, and had his life threatened. He claims to not feel anything anymore. The filmmakers, worried about Alex’s well-being, showed the footage to the administrators and his parents, and when his parents confronted the administrators, a handful of students are disciplined and punished through bus suspension. During the school's efforts, students are shown lying about what happened. Alex is told to tell someone if he is bullied again. Alex claims he won't because he told adults in sixth grade and nothing was done.

A few months later, Ja’Meya arrives home with her mother. She is excited to be home again and states how different everything looks.

It is Alex’s last day of school. Other students are shown being friendly towards him, signing T-shirts, and laughing with him. Kelby’s parents pulled her out of school because on her first day back, everyone moved their desks to be away from her, showing that nothing has changed. Tyler’s family is later shown hosting rallies to gain awareness for the other children around the world who committed suicide due to bullying. Eventually they start an online group and meet others whose children met a similar fate. They start a memorial service called “Stand for the Silent” to help reach out to children and adults who are or have been victims of bullying and tackle the problem together.

Kelby, while also in attendance, stands for the support of the fallen children. Ty’s parents set off groups of balloons to symbolize the lost lives throughout the country. They give out wristbands to help raise awareness for their cause. Ty’s father stands before the crowd to give a speech, in which he states that he will forever fight against bullies everywhere because, “[his] son will be 11 years old forever.”

Cast
 Ja'Meya Jackson
 Kelby Johnson
 Lona Johnson
 Bob Johnson
 Alex Libby
 Jackie Libby
 Philip Libby
 Maya Libby
 Jada Libby
 Ethan Libby
 Logan Libby
 Kim Lockwood
 David Long
 Tina Long
 Teryn Long
 Troy Long
 Devon Matthews
 Barbara Primer
 Kirk Smalley
 Laura Smalley
 Trey Wallace
 Tyler Lee Long (archive footage)
 Mercedes Banks
 Dean Donehoo
 Vickie Reed
 Jeff Johnson
 Howard Ensley
 Derek Parker
 Chloe Albright
 James Ramsey
 Paula Crandall
 Nicholas King
 Nolan Watchorn
 Thomas Mapes

Soundtrack

Release 
Bully had its global premiere at Italy's Ischia Film Festival on July 17, 2011. Bully was acquired by The Weinstein Company immediately after its premiere at the Tribeca Film Festival. The film was released in United States theaters on March 30, 2012. The film was released on Blu-ray and DVD on February 12, 2013 only with the PG-13 rated version.

Production 
The film's director, Lee Hirsch was a victim of bullying as a child and decided to make a documentary so that the hidden lives of bullied children would be brought into the open.  He approached the nonprofit organization Fractured Atlas, which gave him partial funding for the film. Significant additional funding was provided by Sundance Institute Documentary Fund, The Fledgling Fund, BeCause Foundation and Gravity Films. The film's music was composed by Ion Michael Furjanic (former member of the band Force Theory) and indie band Bishop Allen.

In a screening in Minneapolis in September 2011, Hirsch told the audience that his having been bullied as a child was part of the inspiration for the film. In an interview with a Twin Cities news website after the screening, Hirsch continued, "I felt that the hardest part of being bullied was communicating, and getting help. I couldn’t enroll people’s support. People would say things like 'get over it,' even my own father and mother. They weren't with me. That was a big part of my wanting to make the film. It's cathartic on a daily basis." Hirsch said he hoped the film grows far beyond him, inspiring advocacy, engagement, and empowerment not just in people who are being bullied and in their families, but by those of us who all too often stand by and do nothing. He stated, "I hope we build something that’s really sustainable. I hope this takes on a life of its own."

MPAA rating 
On February 27, 2012, a Change.org online petition was created, directed to the CEO of the Motion Picture Association of America (MPAA) in order to reduce the movie's rating from R (due to some language as shown in the poster) to PG-13, because the R rating would prevent the intended audience from seeing the film. The filmmakers lost the appeal for a PG-13 rating by one vote. As of March 15, 2012, Butler had collected more than 300,000 signatures, but the MPAA initially hesitated to make the change. Joan Graves of the MPAA said that though Bully is a "wonderful film", the organization's primary responsibility is to provide information to parents about the films' content.

On March 26, 2012, The Weinstein Company announced that it would release Bully unrated, in protest of the MPAA's decision. This effectively restricted the movie to art-house and independently owned theaters since AMC, Cinemark, and many other American cinema chains have policies against screening unrated films. Despite this, AMC announced it would allow minors to watch the film upon receipt of a signed permission slip from a parent or guardian. Regal Cinemas did indicate they would play the film; however it would treat it as an R-rated feature.

In Canada (where each province sets its own rating), as of March 30, 2012, Bully has received PG ratings (from six of ten provinces: Alberta, British Columbia, Manitoba, Ontario, Québec and Saskatchewan) with no age restrictions but warnings for coarse language.

In April, The Weinstein Company came to an agreement with the MPAA. After toning down the profanity, the film received a new rating of PG-13 (for intense thematic material, disturbing content and some strong language—all involving kids), which meant that children of all ages could watch the movie without an adult. The Weinstein Company subsequently announced that the PG-13 rated version of Bully would be released nationwide on April 13, 2012. When it was released, its widest release was in 265 theaters.

Critical reception
Bully was positively received by critics.  Review aggregator Rotten Tomatoes gave the film an 85% based on 142 reviews, with an average score of 7.20/10, making the film "Certified Fresh", stating "Hard-hitting and gracefully filmed, Bully powerfully delivers an essential message to an audience that may not be able to see it." At Metacritic, the film received an average score of 74/100, based on 33 reviews, which indicates "generally favorable reviews".

Roger Ebert said:  “'Bully' is a sincere documentary but not a great one. We feel sympathy for the victims, and their parents or friends, but the film helplessly seems to treat bullying as a problem without a solution."

The film was referenced in the South Park episode "Butterballs", particularly a scene in which Kyle asks Stan (who created an anti-bullying documentary) "If this video needs to be seen by everyone, why don't you put it on the Internet for free?" to which Stan had no answer.

Awards and accolades 

 2012 Awards Circuit Community Awards
 Best Documentary Feature Film - Lee Hirsch (Nominated)

 2011 Bergen International Film Festival
 Best Documentary Feature Film - Lee Hirsch (Won)

 2013 Broadcast Film Critics Association Awards
 Best Documentary Feature (Nominated)

 2013 Cinema Eye Honors Awards, US
 Best Documentary Film - Lee Hirsch (Won)

 2012 Dallas-Fort Worth Film Critics Association Awards
 Best Documentary (2nd place)

 2012 Denver Film Critics Society
 Best Documentary Film (Nominated)

 2013 Gay and Lesbian Entertainment Critics Association (GALECA)
 Documentary of the Year (Nominated)

 2013 Gold Derby Awards
 Documentary Feature - Lee Hirsch and Cynthia Lowen (Nominated)

 2012 Golden Trailer Awards
 Best Documentary - The Weinstein Company and The AV Squad (Nominated)
 Best Documentary Poster - The Weinstein Company (Nominated)

 2011 Hamptons International Film Festival
 Film of Conflict and Resolution - Lee Hirsch (Won)

 2012 Houston Film Critics Society Awards
 Best Documentary Feature (Nominated)

 2012 Las Vegas Film Critics Society Awards
 Best Documentary (Won)

 2013 Motion Picture Sound Editors, USA
 Best Sound Editing - Sound Effects, Foley, Dialogue, ADR and Music in a Feature Documentary - Christopher Barnett, Al Nelson, Gary Rydstrom, Ion Michael Furjanic, Pete Horner, Bob Edwards and Pascal Garneau (Nominated)

 2015 New Media Film Festival
 Best LGBT (Won)

 2015 News & Documentary Emmy Awards
 Best Documentary - Lee Hirsch and Cynthia Lowen (Nominated)
 Outstanding Informational Programming - Long Form - Lee Hirsch, Sally Jo Fifer, Cindy Waitt, Lois Vossen and Cynthia Lowen (Nominated)

 2012 North Texas Film Critics Association, US
 Best Documentary (Won)

 2013 Online Film & Television Association
 Best Documentary Picture - Cynthia Lowen, Lee Hirsch and Cindy Waitt (Nominated)

 2013 PGA Awards
 Best Documentary Film - Lee Hirsch and Cynthia Lowen (Won)

 2012 Phoenix Film Critics Society Awards
 Best Documentary (Nominated)

 2012 San Diego Film Critics Society Awards
 Best Documentary (Nominated)

 2011 Silverdocs Documentary Festival
 Documentary - Lee Hirsch (Nominated)

 2012 Southeastern Film Critics Association Awards
 Best Documentary (2nd place)

 2012 St. Louis Film Critics Association, US
 Best Documentary Feature Film (2nd place)

 2012 São Paulo International Film Festival
 Best Foreign Film - Lee Hirsch (Nominated)

 2011 Tribeca Film Festival
 Best Documentary Feature - Lee Hirsch (Nominated)

 2012 Washington DC Area Film Critics Association Awards
 Best Documentary (Won)

 2011 Zurich Film Festival 
 Best International Documentary Film - Lee Hirsch (Nominated)

References

External links 

2011 films
American documentary films
Films shot in Georgia (U.S. state)
Films shot in Iowa
Films shot in Mississippi
Films shot in Oklahoma
Films shot in Texas
American independent films
Rating controversies in film
Films about bullying
2011 documentary films
Documentary films about education in the United States
2010s English-language films
The Weinstein Company films
2010s American films